Hervé Le Bras (born June 6, 1943) is a French demographer and historian.

Early life
Hervé Le Bras was born on June 6, 1943 in Paris, France. He graduated from the École Polytechnique.

Career
Le Bras did an internship in anthropology in Chad from 1966 to 1967. He was a statistician in neurolinguistics at the Institut national de la santé et de la recherche médicale (INSERM) from 1967 to 1970.

Le Bras was a lecturer at his alma mater, the École Polytechnique, from 1974 to 1992 and Sciences Po from 1979 to 1990. He was also Professor of Geometry, Representation and Morphology at the École Nationale Supérieure d'Architecture de Paris-Belleville from 1969 to 1990. He was a Visiting Professor at the University of Geneva in Switzerland as well as the University of Michigan and the University of Virginia in the United States.

Le Bras is an emeritus researcher at the Institut national d'études démographiques (INED) and director of research at the École des hautes études en sciences sociales (EHESS). He was a conference director at the École nationale d'administration from 2009 to 2010.

Le Bras has been a Fellow of Churchill College, Cambridge since 2002. He is a Knight of the Legion of Honour.

Works

References

Living people
1943 births
Chevaliers of the Légion d'honneur
École Polytechnique alumni
Academic staff of École Polytechnique
Academic staff of Sciences Po
Fellows of Churchill College, Cambridge
French demographers
20th-century French historians
French statisticians
French people of Breton descent
21st-century French historians
Demographers